John or Jack Fenton may refer to:

 Jack R. Fenton (1916–2007), leader in the California State Assembly
 Jack and Maddie Fenton, fictional characters from the Nickelodeon animated television series, Danny Phantom
 John Fenton (hurler) (born 1955), Irish hurler
 John William Fenton (1829–1890), bandmaster
 John Charles Fenton (1880–1951), Scottish lawyer
 John E. Fenton, judge
 John Fenton (musician)
 John Fenton (priest) (1921–2008), British priest and New Testament scholar
 John Fenton (MP for Rochdale), British Member of Parliament for Rochdale and father of Roger Fenton
 John Fenton (died 1556), MP for Stamford (UK Parliament constituency)

See also
John Fenton-Cawthorne, British Conservative politician